Jerry Fuller (born November 19, 1938) is an American songwriter, singer and record producer.

Biography
Jerry Fuller was born in Fort Worth, Texas, United States, to a musical family. He and his brother Bill performed as a duo in their home state, recording for the local Lin label, before Jerry branched out on his own and began writing his own material. In 1959, he moved to Los Angeles, California, and secured a performing contract with Challenge Records. His rockabilly version of "Tennessee Waltz" made No. 63 on the Billboard Hot 100, and earned him an invitation to appear on American Bandstand.

In 1961, he wrote "Travelin' Man" which was originally intended for Sam Cooke. Ricky Nelson recorded it instead and the record sold six million copies worldwide. Fuller wrote 23 of Nelson's recordings, including the US Top 10 hits "A Wonder Like You", "Young World", and "It's Up to You".

Fuller toured as a featured singer with The Champs, whose other members included Glen Campbell, Jimmy Seals, and Dash Crofts, before a period in the US Army. On his return in 1963, Challenge / Four Star moved him to New York City to run its east coast operation. There he discovered a garage band, The Knickerbockers, and produced their 1965 hit "Lies".

In 1967, he moved to Columbia Records as a producer. His first discovery was Gary Puckett and The Union Gap, whom he found in a San Diego bowling alley lounge. He wrote and produced the group's hits "Young Girl" (a UK No. 1), "Lady Willpower", and "Over You", all three written and produced by Fuller. He also produced Mark Lindsay, The Peanut Butter Conspiracy, and O.C. Smith, for whom he produced the hits "The Son of Hickory Holler's Tramp" and "Little Green Apples".

In 1970 he started Moonchild production company, writing and producing the hit "Show and Tell" for Al Wilson in 1973.

Discography

Albums

Singles

References

External links

[ AllMusic entry]
Jerry Fuller Interview NAMM Oral History Library (2020)

1938 births
Living people
People from Fort Worth, Texas
Record producers from Texas
Songwriters from Texas
Challenge Records artists
Apex Records artists
Northern soul musicians